Jandakot is a locality in south-west Western Australia in the southern part of the Perth metropolitan area.  It may refer to:

 Jandakot, Western Australia
 Jandakot Airport
 Jandakot Mound
 Electoral district of Jandakot